Oliva nivosa is a species of sea snail, a marine gastropod mollusk in the family Olividae, the olives.

Distribution
This marine species occurs off French Guiana.

References

 Hunon C., Hoarau A. & Robin A. (2009) Olividae (Mollusca, Gastropoda) Revue exhaustive des espèces récentes du genre Oliva / A complete survey of Recent species of the genus Oliva. Hackenheim: Conchbooks. 253 pp
Le genre Oliva Bruguière, 1789, aux Antilles et en Guyane françaises. Description de Oliva lilacea nov. sp. Bulletin de la Société Linnéenne de Bordeaux 41(4) "2013": 437–454, sér. 148, nouvelle série

External links
 Marrat, F. P. 1870-1871. Monograph of the genus Oliva. In: G.B. Sowerby II (ed.), Thesaurus Conchyliorum, vol. 4 (29-30): 1-46 [1871], pl. 328bis–341 [1870], 342-351 [1871]. London, privately published

nivosa